Canevaro is a surname. Notable people with the surname include:

 César Canevaro (1846–1922), Peruvian soldier and politician
 Domenico Canevaro (1683–1745), Italian politician
 Felice Napoleone Canevaro (1838–1926), Italian admiral and politician

See also
 Canevari
 Sergio Canavero (born 1964), Italian neurosurgeon